Preston Park is a  public park in Preston in the London Borough of Brent. It is Green Flag accredited.

It is a grassed area with scattered trees, with two sports pavilions and a children's playground.

There is access from Carlton Avenue East, College Road and Montpelier Rise.

See also

 Brent parks and open spaces

References

Parks and open spaces in the London Borough of Brent